Louis Ormont (1918 – November 15, 2008) was an American psychologist and one of the earliest practitioners of group psychotherapy based on a psychoanalytic model.

Educated at Temple University and at Yale University, Ormont founded The Center for Group Studies in New York City in 1989. He was also a prolific playwright who produced more than fifty manuscripts for the stage, television, and films.

Bibliography 

Ormont actively published papers from 1958 through 2004 in the American Journal of Psychotherapy, The British Journal of Medical Psychology, Marriage and Family Living, The Psychoanalytic Review, American Journal of Psychiatry, other journals, and the following books:

 Ormont, L.R., Hunt, M. & Corman, R. (1964). The Talking Cure. New York: Harper and Row.
 Ormont, L.R. & Stean, H. (1981). The Practice of Conjoint Treatment. New York: Behavioral Science Press.
 Ormont, L.R. (1992). The Group Therapy Experience. New York: St. Martin’s Press.
 Ormont, L.R., (2001). The Technique of Group Treatment. Connecticut: Psychosocial Press.

References

External links
 https://www.groupcenter.org/
 https://web.archive.org/web/20090505062835/http://www.ormont.org/default.cfm
 Finding aid for Ormont's papers at Adelphi University
 Ormont's obituary

1918 births
2008 deaths
20th-century American psychologists
Temple University alumni
Yale University alumni